Robin Eric Hahnel (born March 25, 1946) is an American economist and professor emeritus of economics at American University. He was a professor at American University for many years and traveled extensively advising on economic matters all over the world. He is best known for his work on participatory economics with Z Magazine editor Michael Albert.

Politically, Hahnel considers himself a product of the New Left and is sympathetic to libertarian socialism. He has been active in many social movements and organizations for forty years, notably as a participant in student movements opposed to the American invasion of South Vietnam, more recently with the Southern Maryland Greens, a local chapter of the Maryland Green Party, and the Green Party of the United States. Hahnel's work in economic theory and analysis is informed by the work of Marx, Keynes, Piero Sraffa, Michał Kalecki, and Joan Robinson, among others. He has served as a visiting professor or economist in Cuba, Peru, and England.

Early critiques: Orthodox Marxism and welfare economics
Hahnel was an undergraduate at Harvard when he met Albert, who was studying at the Massachusetts Institute of Technology. Over the course of roughly three decades the duo would produce seven books together. Among the early writings was "Marxism and Socialist Theory" an evaluation of Marxist and Marxist–Leninist theory that emphasized what they believed were serious flaws. Albert and Hahnel argued that while those aspects of Marxist theory rejecting the institutions of private property and markets were well-founded, other aspects of Marxist and Marxist–Leninist doctrine, including its economistic bias, dialectical methodology, historical materialism, class concepts, labour theory of value, crises theory and rejection of visionary thinking, and authoritarian values and tendencies, were either partially or wholly flawed; and often constituted obstacles in the struggle for social justice. Subsequently, they produced "Socialism, Today and Tomorrow", which was an analysis of socialism in the Soviet Union, China and Cuba, as well as a sketch of an alternative theoretical framework for socialism.

Their technical study of mainstream welfare economics, "A Quiet Revolution in Welfare Economics", was originally published by Princeton, but did not receive wide distribution. The underground interest in the book prompted its being made available on-line. They argued that traditional welfare economic theory was in an intractable crisis. The core approach that competitive markets produce social efficiency was yielding diminishing returns and "has thwarted, rather than facilitated, advances in analyses of the labour process, externalities, public goods, preference development and institutional structures."  The traditional socialist solution of public enterprise combined with centrally planned allocation was found equally lacking. In conclusion they argued that in clarifying the reasons why traditional models were deficient they had cleared a path that suggested probable directions for an alternative paradigm. The significant social and ecological inefficiencies of private enterprise market economies, public enterprise centrally planned economies, and related variants, necessitated both the re-organization of production and consumption institutions and the search for compatible "allocative mechanisms that allow informed individual rationality to be fully consistent with social rationality."  Their next step, the formulation of a relatively detailed "full" vision of an economy based upon participatory democratic planning was their attempt to provide an answer to this challenge.

Participatory economics

In 1991, as the Soviet bloc crumbled and capitalism emerged triumphant Albert and Hahnel published "The Political Economy of Participatory Economics", a model of an economy based upon allocation by participatory democracy within an integrated framework of nested production and consumption councils that was proposed as an alternative to contemporary capitalism, centralized state socialism and market socialism. In ensuing years Hahnel and Albert fleshed out the gaps in their vision, discussed possible complementary political and cultural institutions, and replied to many of their critics.

Ecological economics
Throughout much of this time Hahnel had been teaching advanced courses in ecological economics at American University. His ecological economic vision seeks to incorporate the ecological and social costs entailed in production, consumption, and distribution in the price signals for each good. Because of the widely recognized difficulties of quantifying ecological and social costs, Hahnel emphasized the necessity of utilizing qualitative data in addition to quantitative data to ensure accurate price signals. Qualitative data can best be elucidated through the mechanisms of an inclusive and participatory democratic informational framework.

In terms of the current day ecological problems Hahnel acknowledges that green and pollution taxes are likely to be more effective than alternative schemes such as the marketization of natural resources using permit systems or regulatory "command and control" methods. An optimally efficient green tax requires taxing polluters an amount equal to external costs. Corporations can be expected to try to pass the extra costs on to consumers by raising prices; however, Hahnel notes that "part of the reason pollution taxes improve efficiency in a market economy is that they discourage consumption of goods whose production requires pollution precisely by making those products more expensive for consumers." He recommends linking tax increases related to "bads" such as pollution to tax decreases on "goods" related to productive work, as exemplified by social security taxes. (The ABC's of Political Economy, 272)

From an international strategic perspective however, he has thrown his support behind a cap and trade system. He argues that progress has been made toward a cap and trade system and should not be discarded, that such a system would foreground scientific and climatological expertise rather than economic expertise, and that such a system is much more achievable on an international level.

Corporate-sponsored globalization, criticism and activism
As the nineties wore on, Hahnel became increasingly immersed in analysis of corporate-sponsored globalization, and actively participated in movements opposed to it. As disparate oppositional groups planned and unified for what were to be momentous demonstrations against the World Trade Organization meetings in Seattle in 1999, Hahnel was among the leading economic analysts educating popular movements.

His first major book authored without Michael Albert was "Panic Rules". The book features concise analysis of crises due to financial liberalization in the era of globalization, a critique of the ideology and practices of global institutions such as the WTO, IMF and World Bank, and a tightly argued explanation of the conditional insights and much overlooked limitations of international trade theory based upon Ricardo's theory of comparative advantage.

Hahnel acknowledged core insights within comparative advantage theory, noting that "if opportunity costs of producing goods are different in different countries there are potential gains from specialization and trade." However, he explained that the potential gains are realized only under specific conditions, and expounded on the many real world factors that can account for significant efficiency losses. Among the most significant factors for efficiency losses from trade are inaccurate prices due to significant externalities that cause misidentification of comparative advantages, unstable international markets that create macro inefficiencies, and adjustment costs of moving people in and out of industries that can be considerable. Moreover, in spite of Ricardo's theory, international trade usually aggravates global inequality because terms of trade are set inequitably as a result of the dominant bargaining positions of northern countries, and thanks to class structures that ensure the costs and benefits of trade are distributed unfairly within countries. (see ABC's of Political Economy, 176–207)

Theory and practice of economic justice and democracy
In recent years Hahnel has stopped publishing books with Michael Albert on participatory economics. He has done much work in academic oriented political economic theory. Notably, he wrote an essay analysing the works of Amartya Sen that was published in the anthology "Understanding Capitalism: Critical Analysis from Karl Marx to Amartya Sen". There is a noticeable turn in his recent work towards consideration of mid-term strategies such as global Keynesianism and living wage reforms while maintaining his long-term sights on a libertarian socialist economy based on equitable cooperation. He has also written extensively on environmental economic issues, such as carbon trade and the formal Coase theorem. Links between his work on participatory economics and his research of economic justice and democracy, as well as environmental issues, are prevalent in the books Economic Justice and Democracy: From Competition to Cooperation (2005) and Of the people, By the people – The Case for a Participatory Economy (2012).

Bibliography
 Unorthodox Marxism with M. Albert (1978)
 Socialism Today and Tomorrow with M. Albert (1981)
 Marxism and Socialist Theory with M. Albert (1981)
 Liberating Theory with M. Albert, Holly Sklar, Lydia Sargent, Noam Chomsky, Mel King, and Leslie Kagan (1986)
 Quiet Revolution in Welfare Economics with M. Albert (1990)
 Looking Forward – Participatory Economics for the Twenty First Century with M. Albert (1991)
 The Political Economy of Participatory Economics with M. Albert (1991)
 Panic Rules (1999)
 ABC's of Political Economy (2003)
 Economic Justice and Democracy: From Competition to Cooperation (2005)
 Green Economics (2011)
 Of the people, By the people – The Case for a Participatory Economy (2012)
 Radical Political Economy: Sraffa versus Marx (2017)
 Democratic Economic Planning (2021)

See also

 Direct democracy
 Inclusive Democracy
 Industrial Workers of the World
 Parecon
 Socialist economies
 Market abolitionism
 Workplace democracy

Notes

External links

 American University page on Robin Hahnel
 A Guide through the Economic Crisis
 Anarchist Planning Interview with Chris Spannos

1946 births
Living people
21st-century American economists
American anarchists
American anti-capitalists
American anti-globalization writers
American male non-fiction writers
American University faculty and staff
Ecological economists
Harvard University alumni
Libertarian socialists
Portland State University faculty
Socialist economists
Writers about direct democracy